"Picturesque Ukraine" Is a series of drawings made by Taras Shevchenko in 1844. Made using the technique of etching, the series was originally meant to consist of twelve published prints each year. However, due to financial difficulties this was made impossible, and only one album of six prints was finished, which consisted of In Kyiv, Vydubychi Monastery, Ship Council, Fairy Tale, Old Age, and Gifts in Chyhyryn.

Gallery

References 

Taras Shevchenko
19th-century etchings
Works about Ukraine